The Airborne Edge is a line of Australian two-seat ultralight trikes designed and produced by Airborne Windsports of Redhead, New South Wales. The aircraft are supplied as a completed aircraft and not as a kit.

Design and development
The Edge features a cable-braced hang glider-style high-wing, weight-shift controls, a single-seat, open cockpit, tricycle landing gear and a single engine in pusher configuration. It has been produced in many different sub-models and is known in 2012 as the Classic.

The aircraft wing is made from bolted-together aluminium tubing, with its single or optionally double surface wing covered in Dacron sailcloth. Its  span wing is supported by a single tube-type kingpost and uses an "A" frame control bar. The landing gear features suspension on all three wheels, with the main gear bungee suspended and the nose wheel suspended with rubber blocks. The nose wheel steering includes a dampener and drum brakes. The main wing support mast folds down to allow wing installation. The aircraft can be broken-down for ground transport or storage and assembly for flight can be accomplished in 30 minutes.

The Edge includes full dual controls for flight training, including dual steering, dual control bar extenders and two throttles. Engines supplied include the twin cylinder, two-stroke air-cooled  Rotax 503 or the liquid-cooled  Rotax 582.

Operational history
The Edge was flown in west Africa in aerial support of an elephant conservation project and was also used in Indonesia to monitor endangered orangutan populations.

Variants
Edge 582 Executive
Fully equipped model with all the options, including full cockpit fairing and wheel pants, with the Streak double-surface high performance wing and liquid-cooled  Rotax 582 engine. Sold circa 2000.
Edge X 503 Wizard
Basic model without fairings to reduce weight and cost, with a single surface wing and air-cooled  Rotax 503 engine. Sold circa 2000.
Classic S
Model sold circa 2004. An Edge model with all options and a liquid-cooled  Rotax 582 powerplant.
Edge X TS-912/Streak II XT
Model with all options sold circa 2005, with  Rotax 912 four stroke powerplant and the double surface Streak XT wing.
X-Series Classic
Production model as of 2012, with  Rotax 582 engine, optional Wizard or Streak wing

Specifications (Edge Wizard)

References

External links

1990s Australian ultralight aircraft
Single-engined pusher aircraft
Ultralight trikes